The H. C. Chrislip House, at 709 N. 14th St. in Duncan, Oklahoma, was built in 1928.  It was listed on the National Register of Historic Places in 1993.

It is a concrete, stucco-clad house, the first house in Mission Revival style which was designed by local architect David Robert Gray.

References

National Register of Historic Places in Stephens County, Oklahoma
Mission Revival architecture in Oklahoma
Houses completed in 1928